"The Song of the Vermonters, 1779" is a poem by the American Quaker poet John Greenleaf Whittier (December 17, 1807 – September 7, 1892) about the U.S. state of Vermont during its years of independence (1777–1791), sometimes called the Vermont Republic.


Overview
The ballad describes a period when Vermont deflected land claims from the British colonies of New Hampshire and New York.

Whittier originally wrote the poem in 1828. It was published anonymously by The New-England Magazine in 1833. Similarities in the last stanza with prose by Ethan Allen caused many to believe the entire work to be by Allen. For nearly sixty years the poem was republished with credit going to Ethan Allen. The confusion was perpetuated in part by Henry Stevens, a co-founder of the Vermont Historical Society. In 1843, Stevens presented the poem to the Society as one by Allen which he had "discovered". The discovery was also reported in the Vermont Chronicle. The poem was republished anonymously in England by the Northern Star in July 1847 in an issue which included two other poems by Whittier.

Whittier, however, had acknowledged his authorship in an obscure Massachusetts magazine in 1858. In preparing for an address at a centennial celebration in 1877, a resident of Bennington named Daniel Roberts asked Whittier to confirm his authorship. In July of that year, Whittier acknowledged authorship as "a boy's practical joke." The poem was included in the 1904 Oxford Complete Edition of Whittier's poetry, The Poetical Works of John Greenleaf Whittier. Oxford Complete Edition.

Full text
Ho–all to the borders! Vermonters, come down, 
With your breeches of deerskin and jackets of brown; 
With your red woollen caps and your moccasins come, 
To the gathering summons of trumpet and drum.

Come down with your rifles! 
Let gray wolf and fox 
Howl on in the shade of their primitive rocks; 
Let the bear feed securely from pig-pen and stall; 
Here's two-legged game for your powder and ball.

On our south came the Dutchmen, enveloped in grease; 
And arming for battle while canting of peace; 
On our east crafty Meshech has gathered his band 
To hang up our leaders and eat up our land.

Ho–all to the rescue! For Satan shall work 
No gain for his legions of Hampshire and York! 
They claim our possessions–the pitiful knaves– 
The tribute we pay shall be prisons and graves!

Let Clinton and Ten Broek with bribes in their hands, 
Still seek to divide and parcel our lands; 
We've coats for our traitors, whoever they are; 
The warp is of feathers–the filling of tar:

Does the 'old Bay State' threaten?
Does Congress complain? 
Swarms Hampshire in arms on our borders again? 
Bark the war dogs of Britain aloud on the lake– 
Let 'em come; what they can they are welcome to take.

What seek they among us? 
The pride of our wealth 
Is comfort, contentment, and labor, and health, 
And lands which, as Freemen we only have trod, 
Independent of all, save the mercies of God.

Yet we owe no allegiance, we bow to no throne, 
Our ruler is law and the law is our own; 
Our leaders themselves are our own fellow-men,
Who can handle the sword, or the scythe, or the pen.

Our wives are all true, and our daughters are fair, 
With their blue eyes of smiles and their light flowing hair, 
All brisk at their wheels till the dark even-fall, 
Then blithe at the sleigh-ride the husking and ball!

We've sheep on the hillsides, we've cows on the plain, 
And gay-tasselled corn-fields and rank-growing grain; 
There are deer on the mountains, and wood-pigeons fly 
From the crack of our muskets, like clouds on the sky.

And there's fish in our streamlets and rivers which take 
Their course from the hills to our broad bosomed lake; 
Through rock-arched Winooski the salmon leaps free, 
And the portly shad follows all fresh from the sea.

Like a sunbeam the pickerel glides through the pool, 
And the spotted trout sleeps where the water is cool, 
Or darts from his shelter of rock and of root, 
At the beaver's quick plunge, or the angler's pursuit.

And ours are the mountains, which awfully rise, 
Till they rest their green heads on the blue of the skies; 
And ours are the forests unwasted, unshorn, 
Save where the wild path of the tempest is torn.

And though savage and wild be this climate of ours, 
And brief be our season of fruits and of flowers, 
Far dearer the blast round our mountains which raves,
Than the sweet summer zephyr which breathes over slaves!

Hurrah for Vermont! For the land which we till 
Must have sons to defend her from valley and hill; 
Leave the harvest to rot on the fields where it grows, 
And the reaping of wheat for the reaping of foes

From far Michiscom's wild valley, to where 
Poosoonsuck steals down from his wood-circled lair, 
From Shocticook River to Lutterlock town 
Ho–all to the rescue! Vermonters come down!

Come York or come Hampshire, come traitors or knaves, 
If ye rule o'er our land ye shall rule o'er our graves; 
Our vow is recorded–our banner unfurled, 
In the name of Vermont we defy all the world!

References

1828 poems
American poems
Poetry and hymns by John Greenleaf Whittier
Pre-statehood history of Vermont
Vermont Republic
Vermont culture
History of New England
Works originally published in The New-England Magazine